Caesium tungstate or cesium tungstate is an inorganic chemical compound that is notable for forming a very dense liquid in solution. The solution is used in diamond processing, since diamond sinks in it, whereas most other rocks float.

Properties
Caesium tungstate forms colorless crystals, which are strongly hygroscopic. A phase transition from orthorhombic to hexagonal crystal system occurs at 536 °C.

Preparation
Caesium tungstate can be obtained by the reaction between caesium chloride (CsCl) and silver tungstate (Ag2WO4) or the reaction between tungstic acid and caesium hydroxide.

References

Caesium compounds
Tungstates